Chasseur, a French term for "hunter", is the designation given to certain regiments of French and Belgian light infantry or light cavalry to denote troops trained for rapid action.

History
This branch of the French Army originated during the War of the Austrian Succession when, in 1743, Jean Chrétien Fischer was authorized by the Marshal de Belle-Isle to raise a 600 strong mixed force of infantry and cavalry. It was called Chasseurs de Fischer. During the remainder of the 18th century various types of light troops were employed within the French army, either as independent units or as companies within existing regiments.  In 1788, there were 8 battalions of chasseurs, and in March 1793 this was expanded to 21 battalions.  The first battalions of Chasseurs raised by 1788 included:

 (1st) Chasseurs Royaux de Provence
 (2nd) Chasseurs Royaux de Dauphiné
 (3rd) Chasseurs Royaux Corses (Corsican)
 (4th) Chasseurs Corses (Corsican)
 (5th) Chasseurs Cantabres (Cantabrian)
 (6th) Chasseurs Bretons
 (7th) Chasseurs d'Auvergne
 (8th) Chasseurs des Vosges
 (9th) Chasseurs des Cévennes
 (10th) Chasseurs du Gèvaudan
 (11th) Chasseurs des Ardennes
 (12th) Chasseurs du Roussillon

The  were the light infantrymen of the French Imperial army. They were armed the same as their counterparts in the regular line infantry (fusilier) battalions, but were trained to excel in marksmanship and in executing manoeuvres at high speed. From 1840, they wore a long-skirted frock coat. After 1850, however the chasseurs adopted a uniform consisting of a short frock coat with slits in the sides on the bottom edge to allow for better freedom of movement than the previous design. They also wore light blue baggy trousers (in contrast to the red of the line infantry)
tucked into jambières (leather gaiters). The other light infantry unit type, the voltigeurs, specialised as skirmishers and for advance screening of the main force. The chasseurs could also be called upon to form advance guards and scouting parties alongside the voltigeurs.

Following the Napoleonic Wars the  continued to exist as a separate corps within the infantry. Initially a specially trained elite, their tactical role eventually came to match that of the ordinary  (line infantry). By the late 19th century the differences between the two branches were confined to uniform and insignia, although the chasseurs retained a strong esprit de corps. Immediately after the Franco-Prussian War it was argued that the continued existence of a nominally elite class of infantry that was in fact armed and trained to the same standards as the ordinary soldier, was contrary to both military utility and the egalitarian principles of the new republic. However public opinion, influenced by the occasions on which the chasseurs had distinguished themselves during the war was opposed to the disbanding of this distinctive corps. Of these, 4 saw active service in Tunisia, one in Indochina and one in Madagascar during the period 1880-1896. Twelve of the chasseur battalions were re-designated as mountain infantry.

During World War I the French Army maintained 31 battalions of infantry chasseurs plus a varying number of reserve and territorial units. Each infantry division was expected to include at least one battalion of either  or  Each battalion had an establishment of 1,300 to 1,500 men. They were reportedly nicknamed  (black devils) by their German opponents, in reference to their dark colored uniforms. The chasseurs served mainly on the Western Front but detachments were sent to reinforce the Italian front in 1917.

Chasseurs à cheval
The , a type of French light cavalry, date from 1743 when an independent unit (Fischer's Volunteer Company of Chasseurs) was raised during the War of the Austrian Succession to counter Trenck's Pandurs and Croats employed as irregulars by the Austrian army. Originally a mixed corps of light infantry and horsemen, this force proved sufficiently effective to warrant the creation of a single corps:   In 1776 this and other volunteer "legions" had their mounted elements converted into 24 squadrons of  each of which was attached to one of the existing dragoon regiments of the royal cavalry. In 1779 these squadrons were amalgamated into six regiments, each of which was given a regional title (1st  2nd  etc.).

During their earlier history these regiments lacked the higher profile of the identically-armed (but much more lavishly uniformed) hussars. Distinguished by dark green uniforms and a bugle-horn badge, they were frequently used as advance scouting units providing valuable information on enemy movements. In addition Napoleon added a further 5 line regiments to those inherited from the Revolutionary period. Disbanded after the Battle of France, these units were reconstituted in 1944–45 as light armor.

These were light cavalry recruited originally from French volunteers and subsequently from the French settlers in North Africa doing their military service. As such they were the mounted equivalent of the zouaves.

Flanqueurs Chasseurs
In preparation for the invasion of Russia, Napoleon ordered the creation of additional units for the Guard that included the Régiment de Flanqueurs-Chasseurs de la Garde. Along with the regiment of Flanqueues-Grenadiers, this was mainly recruited from the sons and nephews of forest service civil servants or made up of young men who wanted to obtain a position within the Waters and Forests Administration after concluding their military service.

The role of these light infantry soldiers was to flank the main army while on the march, in order to guard against any sudden attack.

Chasseurs Forestiers
The  (forest huntsmen) were militarized units of the Eaux et Forêts administration (Waters and Forests Administration). They were organized in 18 companies and many sections. The  existed between 1875 and 1924. The chasseurs forestiers were classed as elite light infantry troops and could form advance guards and scouting parties due to their knowledge of natural fields and their ability to make or read maps. 

Established by a decree of the newly established Third Republic dated 2 April 1875, the Chasseurs Forestiers  incorporated some personnel of the existing Water and Forest Administration into the French Army on a part-time basis. The purpose was to make use of trained and specialist manpower as part of the armed forces in time of war. The specific roles envisaged for the Chasseurs Forestiers were to provide guides for the regular army and to work with the Engineers in obtaining stocks of timber for military use. 

While provided with distinctive green and grey uniforms plus stocks of standard infantry weapons and equipment, the Chasseurs Forestiers performed their normal forestry service functions in peacetime with only limited involvement in army training and manoeuvers. Upon mobilisation in August 1914 personnel aged between 25 and 48 years saw front line service in the Vosges in northern France. Post-war policy changes led to the disestablishment of the Chasseurs Forestiers as a military body in 1924.

Modern French Army
Since May 1943 there has been a "Régiment de Chasseurs Parachutistes" (1er RCP).

All of these units have different traditions:

  are light infantry units created after 1838.
  are units of the "Arme Blindée Cavalerie": armoured units. The basic organic unit is called regiment and not bataillon to avoid confusing cavalry and infantry chasseurs.
 The airborne infantry units called Régiments de chasseurs parachutistes were created in 1943 with airborne troops from the French Airforce (GIA or ), who were transferred into the Army.
  are the elite mountain infantry of the modern French Army. They are trained to operate in mountainous terrain and to undertake urban warfare.

Although the traditions of these different branches of the French Army are very different, there is still a tendency to confuse one with the other. For example, when World War I veteran Léon Weil died, the AFP press agency stated that he was a member of the 5th "Régiment de Chasseurs Alpins". It was in fact the 5th Bataillon.

Belgian army
From its creation as a permanent force in 1832 the Belgian army included regiments of both chasseurs à pied and chasseurs à cheval, performing the same roles as their French counterparts. Their lineage is a continuation of regiments of hussars and light-dragoons of the army of the Kingdom of the United Netherlands from which they were originated. At the outbreak of World War I in August 1914 there were 3 regiments of Chasseurs à pied, each of 3 battalions, and 3 regiments of mounted Chasseurs.

In 1933 a new regiment of light infantry: the Chasseurs Ardennais, was created to garrison the mountainous region of that name.

In 2011, the 1st Regiment of Chasseurs à cheval/Guides (result of the fusion of the 1st Chasseurs à Cheval and the Regiment of Guides in 2004) was amalgamated with the 2nd/4th Regiment of Chasseurs à cheval, in order to form the Battalion Chasseurs à Cheval (Bataljon Jagers te Paard). The battalion is dedicated to the ISTAR missions and carries the standard of the 1st Chasseurs à Cheval.

U.S. Army
The U.S. Federal Army adopted Chasseurs during the Civil War as a scouting and skirmishing force for use against the Confederate Army. Their uniform was patterned after the French style, with the short, vented coat, though they were issued grey kepis. A notable unit of Civil War Chasseurs were the 65th New York Volunteer Infantry (also known as the 1st United States Chasseurs). The Chasseurs were involved in the Peninsula campaign, as well as the Appomattox campaign, and lost a total of 146 men. They were distinct for choosing to wear M1858 uniform hats (more popularly known as Hardee hats) rather than the kepis.

The 14th Brooklyn, one of the most famous regiments of the Civil War, wore a Chasseur uniform their whole term.

In 1862, following the capture of Confederate-held New Orleans by Federal soldiers, an all-black regiment named the Chasseurs d'Afrique was raised.

Argentinian Army
In the Argentinian Army, the term  (Spanish for hunter, although in a military context it means chasseur or ranger) is used to designate certain special units trained to operate in specific geographical areas, such as mountain or jungle.

See also
 Chasseurs à Cheval de la Garde Impériale
 Jäger (military)
 Voltigeurs
 Chasseurs d'Afrique
 Zouaves
 Chasseurs Ardennais
 Chasseurs Alpins
 Chasseurs Britanniques

Footnotes

References 

 Louis Susane, Historie de l'Ancienne Infanterie Français, Volume I, 1849 Naval and Polytechnical Military Library of Paris, Paris, France.

External links
 Chasseurs alpins
 Chasseur from the french forces in Germany
 French Grenadiers, Chasseurs and Fusiliers of the Napoleonic Wars
 

18th- and 19th-century warrior types
Civil War military equipment of the United States
Combat occupations
Military units and formations of France
French Army

no:Jeger (soldat)